Denis-Benjamin Papineau (November 13, 1789 – January 20, 1854) was joint premier of the Province of Canada for Canada East from 1846 to 1848. His joint premiers for Canada West during this period were William Henry Draper and Henry Sherwood.

Papineau had various professions including seigneur, seigneurial agent, bookseller, merchant, justice of the peace, office holder and politician.

Born in Montreal, he was the son of Joseph Papineau and Rosalie Cherrier. He studied at the Petit Séminaire de Québec. He oversaw the operation of the Seigneury of Petite-Nation, first for his father and later for his brother Louis-Joseph; he also served as postmaster for the region. He also was a partner in a Montreal bookstore. He was named a justice of the peace for Montreal district. In 1822, he became seigneur for the fief of Plaisance. He was elected to the Legislative Assembly of the Province of Canada representing the Ottawa district in Canada East in 1842 and served until the end of 1847. Besides serving as joint premier, he also was Commissioner of Crown Lands and of public works from 1844 to 1847. He died in Sainte-Angélique (Papineauville), Lower Canada.

When he yielded to requests from Denis-Benjamin Viger and Sir Charles Metcalfe to accept an appointment on the Executive Council, Papineau was criticized by many French-Canadians, despite his family's association with reform. His brother Louis-Joseph Papineau had been leader of the reform movement and was exiled for a time for his role in the Lower Canada Rebellion.

His son Denis-Émery later represented the County of Ottawa in the Legislative Assembly.

References

External links

Ancestry of Denis-Benjamin Papineau (in French)

1789 births
1854 deaths
Premiers of the Province of Canada
Members of the Legislative Assembly of the Province of Canada from Canada East
Canadian justices of the peace